Southern Seminary Main Building, originally known as the Hotel Buena Vista and now Main Hall of Southern Virginia University, is a historic hotel building located at Buena Vista, Virginia. It was built in 1890, and is a 3 1/2-story, brick and frame building in an eclectic combination of Queen Anne and French Renaissance style architecture. It features a steep slate covered gable roof, round towers with conical and domical roofs, three-level wooden galleries, and Palladian windows.  By 1907, the building was known as the Southern Seminary Main Building, after consolidation of three campuses of that school.

It was listed on the National Register of Historic Places in 1972.

References

External links

Buildings and structures in Buena Vista, Virginia
National Register of Historic Places in Buena Vista, Virginia
School buildings completed in 1890
Southern Virginia University
University and college buildings on the National Register of Historic Places in Virginia
University and college administration buildings in the United States